Anne-Marie Alonzo,  (December 13, 1951 – June 11, 2005) was a Canadian playwright, poet, novelist, critic and publisher.

Born in Alexandria, Egypt, she immigrated to Quebec when she was twelve. In 1966 she was the victim of a car accident which left her quadriplegic and using a wheelchair.

She received a Bachelor of Arts degree in 1976, a Master of Arts degree in 1978, and a Ph.D. in French studies in 1986 from the Université de Montréal.

The author of 20 books, her poetry collection, Bleus de mine, received the Prix Émile-Nelligan in 1985 and was nominated for the 1985 Governor General's Awards. She co-founded Trois magazine and in 1989 launched the Festival littéraire de Trois.

In 1996, she was made a Member of the Order of Canada.

See also

Canadian literature
Canadian poetry
List of Canadian poets
List of Canadian writers

References

External links
 Literary archives Guide - Anne-Marie Alonzo profile
  The archives of Anne-Marie Alonzo (Fonds Anne-Marie Alonzo, R11692) are held at Library and Archives Canada

1951 births
2005 deaths
Canadian women dramatists and playwrights
Canadian women poets
Canadian poets in French
Canadian lesbian writers
Members of the Order of Canada
People with tetraplegia
Université de Montréal alumni
Writers from Montreal
Lesbian dramatists and playwrights
Lesbian poets
Canadian LGBT poets
Canadian LGBT dramatists and playwrights
20th-century Canadian dramatists and playwrights
20th-century Canadian poets
20th-century Canadian women writers
Canadian dramatists and playwrights in French
Egyptian emigrants to Canada
20th-century Canadian LGBT people
21st-century Canadian LGBT people